Alexander Oblinger (born January 17, 1989) is a Polish-born German professional ice hockey player. He is currently playing for Kölner Haie in the Deutsche Eishockey Liga (DEL). He formerly played with Eisbären Berlin, Thomas Sabo Ice Tigers and ERC Ingolstadt before joining the Straubing Tigers on a one-year contract on April 17, 2016.

After two seasons with the Tigers, Oblinger left as a free agent to sign a one-year deal with Kölner Haie on April 11, 2018.

References

External links

1989 births
Living people
Eisbären Berlin players
German ice hockey right wingers
ERC Ingolstadt players
Kölner Haie players
Straubing Tigers players
Thomas Sabo Ice Tigers players